In Aboriginal mythology, Minawara and Multultu were the legendary ancestors of the Nambutji tribe. They were kangaroo-men, and came from a pile of debris carried away by the Great Flood.  They made a hole to sleep in but were scolded by a rat-man who told them to sit in the tree's shade. They did so and then continued their trip and began wearing feathers; their lungs and mucus were thrown away and turned into rocks.

References

Australian Aboriginal mythology
Legendary mammals
Legendary progenitors